1712 Overture and Other Musical Assaults is a classical music album released in 1989 by Telarc Records. The album contains works by P. D. Q. Bach, the alter ego of Professor Peter Schickele (as well as tracks credited to Schickele himself). It is scored for "really big orchestra and some not-quite so big ensembles, plus unique on-location introductions, spoken on the very historical spots where the actual history happened".

Performers
Professor Peter Schickele, conductor, narrator, pianist, devious instrumentalist and intellectual guide
The Greater Hoople Area Off-Season Philharmonic, Walter Bruno, conductor
I Virtuosi di Hoople

Track listing

Introduction (1:35)
1712 Overture, S. 1712 (11:33)
Introduction (1:12)
Bach Portrait (Schickele) (14:32)
 Introduction (2:53)
Capriccio La Pucelle de New Orleans (The Maid of New Orleans), S. under 18 (3:25)
Introduction (1:14)
Minuet Militaire, S. 1A (3:41)
 Introduction (1:33)
Prelude to Einstein on the Fritz, S. e=mt² (6:37)
Introduction (1:47)
The Preachers of Crimetheus, a ballet in one selfless act, S. 988 (12:27)
Prologue (Bottomless Sorrow; Topless Gaiety) (3:18)
The Lamentations of Jerry Maja (3:06)
Finale: Special Deliverance (5:57)

Awards

References

See also
The Ill-Conceived P. D. Q. Bach Anthology

P. D. Q. Bach albums
1989 albums
Grammy Award for Best Comedy Album
Telarc Records albums
1980s comedy albums